Celeste Epiphany Waite (born 5 May 1994) is an American-British singer and songwriter. In 2019, she became the sixth artist to top the BBC's annual Sound of... poll and win the Rising Star Award at the Brit Awards in the same year. Her debut album Not Your Muse was released in 2021 and debuted at No. 1 on the UK Albums Chart. It earned her nominations for Album of the Year, Best Female Solo Artist and Best New Artist at the 2021 Brit Awards, as well as the 2021 Mercury Prize. In the same year, Celeste was also nominated for the Academy Award for Best Original Song for co-writing "Hear My Voice" from the film The Trial of the Chicago 7 (2020).

Celeste began her career in 2014 providing vocals for electronic producers such as Avicii, Tieks and Real Lies, while also self-publishing content onto SoundCloud on the side. She made her solo debut via Lily Allen's vanity label Bank Holiday Records with the EP The Milk & the Honey (2017). After signing with Polydor Records in 2018, she released her second EP Lately (2019).

Early life and career

1994–2015: Early years and career beginnings 
Celeste Epiphany Waite was born in Culver City, California, on 5 May 1994 to an English mother and a Jamaican father. Her mother had been working as a make-up artist in the U.S., having initially worked in Hong Kong after graduating from beauty school in London. Her father had moved to the U.S. from Jamaica to be with his mother while she studied at university. Following her parents' separation, Celeste moved to her mother's native United Kingdom, settling in Dagenham at the age of three, before moving to the village of Saltdean on the outskirts of Brighton at the age of five, where she spent most of her early years.

At the age of 10, Celeste spent a year doing ballet at a performing arts school where teachers had offered her a scholarship. She recalls becoming interested in music through discovering Aretha Franklin, Billie Holiday and Ella Fitzgerald, whose music was played throughout her family home, before discovering her own music from names such as Thelonious Monk, Koko Taylor and Sun Ra through YouTube and iTunes at the age of 14. Celeste recalls singing hymns at church in Brighton as one of her earliest musical memories. When Celeste was 16, her father died of lung cancer, aged 49.

As a teenager, Celeste would write music and perform in bands. She "accidentally" wrote her first song, "Sirens", with her former bandmates at the age of 16. The song was inspired by the death of her father and was published to YouTube where it got the attention of her current manager. Her manager arranged studio sessions for her at Sarm West Studios in Notting Hill, where the crew were reportedly so impressed with Celeste's song-writing skills, that they would try to give her more time in the studio. At 18, she started working in the studio after she graduated and began taking her music career seriously, whilst playing her first gigs in and around Brighton. Celeste studied Music Technology at Varndean College for her sixth form education.

Celeste told Annie Mac that while her friends asked for driving lessons as their 18th birthday gift, she asked for a Macbook laptop which she would later use to begin recording herself on GarageBand. Celeste published her first SoundCloud song, "Born Again" to the platform in July 2014. The song, which was produced by Tev'n, was described by Jim Carroll of The Irish Times as "a striking blast of soulful, seductive vocals backed by a ghostly electronic r'n'b groove." Throughout 2014, Celeste published more songs such as "DEVIL" and "What's Your Poison?", the latter of which is the only 2014 song that remains on her SoundCloud account. In November 2014, she compiled those three songs into a four-track self-titled EP to the platform. The EP which was described by Vice as a "combination of melancholic pop and glitchy electronic tracks." Celeste also started her BBC musical journey when she uploaded her song "North Circular" onto the BBC Music Introducing website in 2014, where it gained support from DJs on BBC Radio 1. She featured on British dance producer Tieks' 2014 debut single "Sing That Song" which reach No. 90 on the UK Singles Chart. She also featured on Swedish musician Avicii's song "Touch Me" in 2015, prior to making her solo mononymous debut. It was during this time that Celeste assisted electronic duo Real Lies as a vocalist while they toured with Foals in 2015. Celeste completed her GCE Advanced Levels in Music and Textiles in 2016 before working at the local Black Horse pub in Rottingdean.

2016–2017: The Milk & The Honey 
Celeste released her debut single "Daydreaming" under Lily Allen's record label, Bank Holiday Records, in October 2016. The song was produced by London-based producer J. D. Reid and Tev'n. She wrote the song while working in her local Black Horse pub in Rottingdean. She told i-D: "I couldn't wait to leave! I was pulling pints and listening to Shirley Bassey imagining I was in Carnegie Hall doing a performance in floor length fur." Celeste made her radio debut in December 2016 when BBC Radio 1 presenter Annie Mac played "Daydreaming" after announcing Celeste as one of her "New Names". The song was added to the BBC Radio 1Xtra playlist in February 2017.

Celeste released her debut EP, The Milk & the Honey, under Bank Holiday Records in March 2017. The 3-track EP includes the tracks "Milk & Honey", "Chocolate" and "Daydreaming". Celeste told The Line of Best Fit that the song "Milk & Honey" is about "finding some sort of Nirvana". She continued by saying that the song "touches upon [her] aspirations of wealth and love and visions [she has] had dreams about, and reminisces on times of melancholy." Eugenie Johnson of DIY compared Celeste's vocals on "Chocolate" to that of Billie Holiday. The EP also received support from Beats 1 presenter Julie Adenuga.

Following the EP's release, Celeste completed a month-long residency at a venue named Laylow in Ladbroke Grove. It was here where Celeste began performing for celebrities such as Riz Ahmed and Idris Elba. "Spike Lee picked up one of my records and I signed it for him, which I never ever expected," Celeste told NME. She embarked on her second-ever UK tour as a supporting act, this time with Rae Morris in September 2017.

Celeste released the promotional single "Not For Me" in October 2017. Celeste described the single as "a song about unrequited love and falling out of love with the city that [she] grew up in, London." She originally wanted the song to be on her first EP, The Milk & the Honey, but lost it on the digital file system. She released it as an independent single after finding it a few months later. Celeste embarked on her third-ever supporting tour of the UK and Europe with the band Skinny Living in October 2017. She played her last show supporting Roy Ayers at The Jazz Café in London in late November 2017.

2018–2019: Lately 
Celeste signed to Polydor Records where she caught the attention of singer-songwriter Michael Kiwanuka, who was already on the label. Throughout 2018, Celeste released the singles "Lately" as well as a live version of the song "Both Sides of the Moon". The two songs were recorded by UK production collective Gotts Street Park and were released ahead of Celeste's second EP, Lately which was to be released in March 2019. In January 2020, Celeste told NME that "Both Sides of the Moon" was her favourite song to write and record, stating "It was the first song at the time that I felt used all of the lyrics and imagery that I'd wanted to for so long in a song, but also had a sonic that I'd been trying to achieve for a while". Celeste signed to Warner Chappell Music publishing company in December 2018, before releasing the single "Father's Son", a "heartbreaking examination of absent fathers", in January 2019. She saw support when "Father's Son" was promoted on BBC Radio 6 Music by Tom Robinson in March 2019, as well as when "Both Sides of the Moon" was played on BBC Radio 1 by Annie Mac and Huw Stephens in October 2019, "Both Sides of the Moon" was also played on Beats 1 by Elton John, who noted: "Celeste is quite something else...watch out for her." The song was also picked for Apple Music's Best of 2018 playlist.

Celeste released her second extended play titled Lately in March 2019. The five-track EP features "Both Sides of the Moon (Live)", "Lately", "Father's Son", "Summer (ft. Jeshi)" and "Ugly Thoughts". The EP charted on the British, German, French and Spanish iTunes charts. Shannon Mahanty of The Guardian wrote, "Proving Celeste's deft ability to sever a heartstring, [Lately] moves from the soul-tinged jazz of the title track, to sultry toxic love ballad 'Both Sides of the Moon', via 'Father's Son'". Celeste performed a showcase at SXSW under BBC Radio 1 in March 2019, as well as a BBC Music Introducing session at Maida Vale Studios in April 2019. Celeste supported Neneh Cherry at the Brighton Festival in May 2019, and performed on the BBC Music Introducing stage at Glastonbury Festival as well as at Field Day in June 2019. Gemma Samways from NME described Celeste's debut Primavera Sound set in June 2019 as "spellbinding", noting that "next year she'll be on a much, much bigger stage."

In the latter half of 2019, Celeste released 4 singles, namely "Coco Blood", "She's My Sunshine" and both a studio and live version of "Strange". "Coco Blood" was described by Savannah Sicurella of Paste as a "warm coming-of-age song" that references Celeste's British-Jamaican heritage. Celeste ventured to Jamaica in order to film the music video which was directed by Akinola Davids, also known as Crack Stevens. Celeste collaborated with Mulberry in June 2019 when she performed at the inaugural #MulberryMyLocal event in London. She provided the theme song for the acclaimed BBC documentary programme Black Hollywood: They Gotta Have Us in July 2019. In October 2019, Celeste supported Janelle Monáe for a night at Columbiahalle in Berlin. She made her television debut when she performed "Strange" on an episode of Later... with Jools Holland on 24 October 2019.

In November 2019, Elton John added "Strange" and "She's My Sunshine" to his personal Apple Music playlist. Celeste gained support from English television personality James Corden after he tweeted "I cannot stop listening to [Celeste] this is her song Strange. It's sensational. I dare you not to love her. I dare you x" Celeste sold out a three-night residency at Omeara in London, before embarking on a tour supporting Michael Kiwanuka in November 2019. On 3 December 2019, Celeste won the BBC Music Award for BBC Music Introducing Artist of the Year. Following this, she appeared on BBC Radio 4's Woman's Hour segment where she talked about her musical upbringing.

On 6 December 2019, the British Phonographic Industry announced that Celeste was the winner of the Rising Star Award at the 2020 Brit Awards and that she would be receiving the award and performing at the ceremony in February 2020. This was followed by the release of Compilation 1.1, a collection of Celeste's "best singles so far". The project is a re-issue of the EP Lately, with "Strange" and "Coco Blood" as additional songs. Celeste took to Twitter to promote the project, saying: "All of my releases so far in one place, Compilation 1.1 is available to stream now". Celeste was later longlisted in the annual poll of 170 music critics, Sound of 2020 by BBC, who admired her for her "Timeless soul to tug at your heartstrings" and specifically noted her as "the one to beat" following her previous accolades from the Brit Awards and BBC Music Introducing.

Whilst in Paris, Celeste made her French television debut when she performed "Strange" after actors Timothée Chalamet, Saoirse Ronan and Florence Pugh promoted their film Little Women (2019) on an episode of the French talk show C à vous in December 2019. She also later performed the song on the New Year's special of Top of the Pops on BBC One.

2020–present: Not Your Muse 

During the 2020 New Year, Celeste was predicted as a breakthrough act for the year by publications such as Vogue, The Guardian, NME, GQ, The Independent, and Ticketmaster UK. On 9 January 2020, Celeste was announced as the winner of BBC's music poll Sound of 2020, before she released her first single of the year, "Stop This Flame". GQ named Celeste as "the most hotly tipped singer for 2020." after the release of "Stop This Flame". Celeste made her first appearance on BBC World News on the Breakfast segment, before having her single "Stop This Flame" debuted on BBC Radio 1 by Annie Mac. Compilation 1.1 reached No. 1 on the UK's iTunes Chart following her BBC Sound of 2020 win.

Celeste made her American late-night television debut when she performed "Strange" on The Late Late Show with James Corden in late January 2020. She was featured alongside Maisie Peters on the front cover of Music Week in January 2020. Following Celeste's performance of "Strange" at the 2020 Brit Awards, Celeste saw interest from other big names in the pop music industry who attended the ceremony such as Billie Eilish, Camilla Cabello, Finneas, and Stormzy. Celeste was listed on Forbes annual 30 Under 30 list, which recognises the 30 most influential people in Europe under the age of 30, in 2020. In late March 2020, Celeste made the front cover of The Sunday Times Style, where she was named "fashion's new front-row star".

In April 2020 she did a virtual performance from her bedroom on The Graham Norton Show in order to encourage social distancing during the COVID-19 pandemic. For the April 2020 fundraiser telecast, The Big Night In, Celeste performed a cover of Bill Withers' "Lean on Me" and also appeared in the Live Lounge Allstars' charity single "Times Like These." Celeste and Sam Smith were the only two artists to do solo musical performances in the telecast. The charity single was Celeste's first No. 1 and her first top 10 entry in the UK. She planned to embark on her first headlining tour of Europe in April 2020, however these shows were cancelled due to the same coronavirus pandemic.

Celeste released the single "I Can See The Change", which was produced by Grammy-winning musician Finneas, in late May 2020. She was nominated in the Best New International Act category at the 2020 BET Awards. She recorded a cover version of Bob Marley's "One Love" for the brand Oakley as part of their "For the Love of Sport" campaign in August 2020. Celeste subsequently released the non-album single, "Little Runaway", alongside a music video. During this time, her single "Stop This Flame", re-gained popularity after becoming the theme song for Sky Sports' weekend coverage (Saturday Night Football) of the Premier League.

Celeste performed and recorded three songs for the original soundtrack for the film The Trial of the Chicago 7 (2020). One of these songs, "Hear My Voice", served as the lead single for the soundtrack album, and earned Celeste a nomination for Best Original Song at the 93rd Academy Awards. She was later nominated for Best Original Song at the 78th Golden Globe Awards with the same song. Celeste also provided the single "A Little Love" as the soundtrack to the 2020 John Lewis & Partners Christmas advert, becoming the first original song and non-cover version to do so. She performed the song on the ninth-season finale of the British television music competition The Voice UK, as well as at the 2020 Royal Variety Performance. She also performed "Stop This Flame" and a cover of Nat King Cole's "Smile" during the 2020 BBC Sports Personality of the Year ceremony. Celeste and American jazz musician Jon Batiste provided a duet version of the song "It's All Right" inspired by the 2020 Disney-Pixar film Soul.

On 31 December 2020, she released the single "Love is Back" and performed it on Jools' Annual Hootenanny 2020/21, where she also performed "It's All Right" and a duet of "Blue Moon" with Tom Jones. Celeste would later perform "Love is Back" on the 449th episode of The Graham Norton Show in mid January 2021. Celeste's debut studio album titled Not Your Muse was released on 29 January 2021, and debuted at number one on the UK Albums Chart. Celeste sang the lullaby "Twinkle, Twinkle, Little Star" in a Super Bowl ad for Inspiration4, an all-civilian charity space mission. At the 2021 Brit Awards, she was nominated for Album of the Year, Best Female Solo Artist and Best New Artist. Not Your Muse was shortlisted for the 2021 Mercury Prize.

Public image 
Celeste's vocals and music are often compared to those of Amy Winehouse, Billie Holiday and Adele. Nick Reilly from NME described Celeste as a "once-in-a-generation talent" who is "the finest British soul singer to emerge in years." David Smyth from Evening Standard wrote, "it's obvious she has it in her to join the wall of fame very soon." Modestas Mankus from Our Culture Mag wrote: "Celeste has established herself as an artist who can mould and bring out authenticity and passion with fluency and maturity that not many artists can do so quickly in their careers [...], [her] consistency in putting out thoughtful and quality music puts her on a positive track to becoming a vastly influential figure in the world of music." BBC Radio 1 DJ Annie Mac said: "I have received countless emotional texts from listeners who have had to sit in their car and lose themselves to her song 'Strange' before carrying on with their evening. Her songwriting is personal and poignant but with universal appeal."
Celeste is also admired by many for her unique fashion sense that recalls the 1960s and is inspired by The Supremes, Édith Piaf and Shirley Bassey. She is styled by Ella Lucia and has been scouted by Alessandro Michele of Gucci. In March 2020, Celeste made the front cover of Sunday Times Style, where she was named "fashion's new front-row star". In October 2020, Celeste was named by Elle magazine as one of "10 Trailblazing Women Changing The Future You Need To Know".

Personal life 
In 2017, Celeste moved to London with only £100 and was fired from her job as she would skip work in order to make music. She told the BBC: "I'd rather call in sick and go to the studio than have the money for that month." She currently resides on Ladbroke Grove, and began dating English model and poet Sonny Hall shortly before the COVID-19 pandemic began. She is a keen football fan and an avid supporter of Arsenal F.C.

Discography

Studio albums

Extended plays

Single compilations

Singles

As lead artist

As featured artist

Promotional singles

Other charted songs

Songwriting credits

Music videos

Filmography

Television

Film

Awards and nominations

Notes

References

External links 
 

1994 births
Living people
People from Culver City, California
Musicians from Brighton and Hove
Brit Award winners
21st-century Black British women singers
English soul singers
British contemporary R&B singers
British women jazz singers
Neo soul singers
Polydor Records artists
American people of English descent
American emigrants to England
Interscope Records artists
People educated at Varndean College
People from Saltdean